Carla Armengol Joaniquet (born 2 April 1998) is a Spanish footballer who plays as a forward for Alavés.

Club career
Armengol started her career in Barcelona's academy. When she made her debut for the club in October 2019, she became only the second player from Barcelona's academy to play for the first team.

References

External links
Profile at La Liga

1998 births
Living people
Women's association football forwards
Spanish women's footballers
People from Baix Llobregat
Sportspeople from the Province of Barcelona
Footballers from Catalonia
FC Barcelona Femení B players
FC Barcelona Femení players
Sevilla FC (women) players
Deportivo Alavés Gloriosas players
Primera División (women) players
Segunda Federación (women) players
Sportswomen from Catalonia